Platyrhynchus may refer to:
 Platyrhynchus Swainson, 1820, a synonym of Megarynchus, a genus of bird 
 Platyrhynchus Van Beneden, 1876, a synonym of Schizodelphis, an extinct genus of cetacean